Centennial Park (known for sponsorship purposes as Whitestone Contracting Stadium) is a sports complex on Taward Street in Oamaru. The main sports played there are rugby union, cricket, and hockey. In 2007, the main ground was renamed Whitestone Contracting Stadium, after naming rights were granted to Whitestone Contracting Limited.

Sports

Rugby union

It is the home ground for the Heartland Championship team North Otago. It has hosted NPC finals and semi-finals. One of the more notable finals was in 2002, when North Otago finished their successful season by beating Horowhenua-Kapiti 43–19. The last final held at Centennial Park was the 2007 Heartland Championship Meads Cup against Wanganui, with North Otago winning. The Highlanders also hold occasional pre-season matches at the ground.

Cricket

The North Otago district cricket team play home matches at the cricket oval, which also hosts local club matches.

References

Rugby union stadiums in New Zealand
Cricket grounds in New Zealand
Sport in Oamaru